Imre Sooäär (born 13 March 1969, in Tallinn) is an Estonian businessman and politician. He has been member of X, XI, XIII, XIII and XIV Riigikogu.

He has been a member of the Res Publica Party and is a member of Estonian Reform Party.

References

1969 births
Estonian Academy of Music and Theatre alumni
Estonian businesspeople
Estonian Centre Party politicians
Estonian Reform Party politicians
Living people
Members of the Riigikogu, 2003–2007
Members of the Riigikogu, 2007–2011
Members of the Riigikogu, 2011–2015
Members of the Riigikogu, 2015–2019
Members of the Riigikogu, 2019–2023
People from Tallinn
Politicians from Tallinn
Res Publica Party politicians
Tallinn University alumni